Spy-Bi-Wire is a serialised JTAG protocol developed by Texas Instruments for their MSP430 micro controllers.

In this protocol only two connections are used instead of the usual four pins for the general JTAG interface. The two connections are a bidirectional data output, and a clock. The clocking signal is split into a period of three clock pulses, for each clock pulse the TDI, TDO and TMS signals are passed on the micro controller via the bidirectional data output.

References

External links
 "MCU debug on a pin-count budget"
 MSP430™ Programming Via the JTAG Interface

Hardware testing
IEEE standards
Texas Instruments microcontrollers